Worldwide, the English rock band the Beatles released 12 studio albums (17 in the US), 6 live albums, 54 compilation albums, 36 extended plays (EPs), 63 singles, 17 box sets, 22 video albums and 68 music videos. In their native United Kingdom, they released 12 studio albums, 13 extended plays (EPs), including one double EP, and 22 singles.  The early albums and singles released from 1962 to 1967 were originally on Parlophone, and their albums and singles from 1968 to 1970 were on their subsidiary label Apple. Their output also includes vault items, remixed mash-ups and anniversary box-sets.

With the first CD releases of their albums in 1987, the Beatles' core catalogue was harmonised worldwide to encompass their original UK studio albums released in 1963–1970, the 1967 US Magical Mystery Tour LP and the Past Masters compilation, the latter two of which include the recordings released from 1962 to 1970 that are not present on the UK albums (mainly non-album singles and B-sides). Since then, other past releases have been reissued in digital formats and on vinyl. The catalogue is currently distributed by Universal Music Enterprises' Calderstone Productions.  This core catalogue contains all 219 tracks intended for commercial release, either as album tracks or singles, that were put out by the Beatles from 1962 to 1970.

The Beatles' international discography is more complicated due to different versions of their albums sometimes being released in other countries, particularly during their early years on Capitol Records in North America. Prior to 1967, it was common practice for British releases to be reconfigured for the American market. The first seven British Beatles albums were converted into ten LPs for the American market, adding material from singles and the UK EPs. With the exception of Magical Mystery Tour, studio releases from Sgt. Pepper's Lonely Hearts Club Band in 1967 forward were uniform in both the UK and the US. The band's first eight albums were released on Parlophone. From 1968, in both the UK and the US, starting with the single "Hey Jude" and the album The Beatles (better known as "the White Album"), new releases appeared on the Beatles' own Apple record label, although Parlophone and Capitol catalogue numbers continued to be used for contractual reasons.

The Beatles' discography was originally released on the vinyl format, with full-length long plays (LPs), shorter EPs and singles. Over the years, the collection has also been released on cassette, 8-track, compact disc (CD), on a USB flash drive in MP3 and 24-bit FLAC format, and on digital media streaming services. The Beatles' UK discography was first released on CD in 1987 and 1988. Between 1962 and 1968, the Beatles released their songs in both mono and stereo versions. The band's catalogue was remastered in both mono and stereo in 2009.

Albums

Studio albums (UK)

Notes

Studio albums (US)

Notes

Live albums

Notes

Compilation albums

Notes

Mash-up albums

Box sets

Notes

EPs

Singles
{| class="wikitable plainrowheaders" style="text-align:center;"
|+ List of singles, with selected chart positions and certifications
|+ 
! scope="col" rowspan="2" style="width:20em;"| Title
! scope="col" rowspan="2" style="width:1em;"| Year
! scope="col" colspan="11"| Peak chart positions
! scope="col" rowspan="2" style="width:12em;"| Certifications
! scope="col" rowspan="2" style="width:12em;"| UK Album
! scope="col" rowspan="2" style="width:12em;"| US Album
|-
! scope="col" style="width:2.6em; font-size:90%;"| UK
! scope="col" style="width:2.6em; font-size:90%;"| AUS
! scope="col" style="width:2.6em; font-size:90%;"| AUT
! scope="col" style="width:2.6em; font-size:90%;"| BEL
! scope="col" style="width:2.6em; font-size:90%;"| CAN
! scope="col" style="width:2.6em; font-size:90%;"| GER
! scope="col" style="width:2.6em; font-size:90%;"| NLD
! scope="col" style="width:2.6em; font-size:90%;"| NOR
! scope="col" style="width:2.6em; font-size:90%;"| NZ
! scope="col" style="width:2.6em; font-size:90%;"| SWI
! scope="col" style="width:2.6em; font-size:90%;"| US
|-
! scope="row"| "My Bonnie""The Saints"
| rowspan="2" | 1962
| 48— || 29— || —— || —— || —— || 32— || —— || —— || —— || —— || 26— 
|
| My Bonnie 
| 
|-
! scope="row" | "Love Me Do""P.S. I Love You"

| 4— || 1— || —— || 37— || 8— || —— || 32— || —— || 1— || —— || 110 
|
 BPI: Silver
 RIAA: Platinum
| rowspan="2" |Please Please Me
| rowspan="2" |Introducing... The Beatles
|-
! scope="row"| "Please Please Me""Ask Me Why"

| rowspan="7"| 1963
| 1— || 52— || —— || —— || —— || 20— || —— || —— || —— || —— || —— 
|
|-
! scope="row"| "From Me to You""Thank You Girl" 
| 1— || 9— || —— || —— || 6— || —— || —— || 9— || —— || —— || ——
|
| 
| Jolly What! The Beatles and Frank Ifield on Stage
 
The Beatles' Second Album
|-
! scope="row"| "She Loves You""I'll Get You" 
| 1— || 3— || —— || —— || 1— || 7— || 7— || 1— || 1— || —— || 1— 
|
 BPI: Silver
| 
| The Beatles' Second Album
|-
! scope="row"| "I Want to Hold Your Hand""This Boy"
| 1— || 1— || —— || 6— || —— || 1— || 1— || —— || —— || —— || —— 
|
 BPI: Gold
| 
| Meet the Beatles!
|-
! scope="row"| "Roll Over Beethoven""Please Mister Postman"
| —— || 1— || —— || —— || 2— || 3147 || —— || 2— || —— || —— || 68—
|
| With the Beatles
| The Beatles' Second Album
|-
! scope="row"| "Misery""Ask Me Why"
| —— || —— || —— || —— || —— || 37— || —— || —— || —— || —— || —— 
|
| Please Please Me
| Introducing... The Beatles
|-
! scope="row"| "I Want to Hold Your Hand""I Saw Her Standing There"
| —— || —1 || —— || —— || 11 || —— || —— || —— || 11 || —— || 114 
|
 BPI: Silver 
 RIAA: Gold
| 

Please Please Me
| Meet the Beatles!
|-
! scope="row"| "Please Please Me""From Me to You" 
| rowspan="19"| 1964
| —— || 3621 || —— || —— || 5— || —— || —— || —— || 21 || —— || 341 
|
 RIAA: Platinum
| Please Please Me

| Introducing... The Beatles

Jolly What! The Beatles and Frank Ifield on Stage
|-
! scope="row"| "Sweet Georgia Brown""Nobody's Child"
| —— || —— || —— || —— || —— || —— || —— || —— || —— || —— || —— 
|
| My Bonnie

The Beatles' First
|
|-
! scope="row"| "All My Loving""This Boy"
| —— || 1— || —— || 16— || 11 || 32— || 2— || 2— || 1— || —— || 45—
|
| With the Beatles
| Meet the Beatles!
|-
! scope="row"| "Why""Cry for a Shadow"
| —— || —— || —— || —— || —— || —— || —— || —— || —— || —— || 88— 
|
| The Beatles' First
|
|-
! scope="row"| "Twist and Shout""There's a Place"
| —— || 5— || —— || —— || 5— || 10— || 9— || 7— || 1— || —— || 274 
|
 BPI: Platinum
 RIAA: Platinum
|Please Please Me
| Introducing... The Beatles
|-
! scope="row"| "Komm, gib mir deine Hand""Sie liebt dich"
| —— || —— || —— || —— || —— || 17 || —— || —— || —— || —— || —— 
|
| 
| Something New

|-
! scope="row"| "Can't Buy Me Love""You Can't Do That"
| 1— || 1— || —— || 5— || 333 || 24— || 1— || 3— || 1— || —— || 148 
|
 RIAA: Gold
 BPI: Silver
| A Hard Day's Night
| A Hard Day's Night  
|-
! scope="row"| "Do You Want to Know a Secret""Thank You Girl"
| —— || —— || —— || —— || —— || 34— || —— || —— || 2— || —— || 235
|
 RIAA: Gold
| Please Please Me

| Introducing... The Beatles

The Beatles' Second Album
|-
! scope="row"| "Sie liebt dich""I'll Get You"
| —— || —— || —— || —— || 20— || —— || —— || —— || —— || —— || 97— 
|
|
| 

The Beatles' Second Album
|-
! scope="row"| "Ain't She Sweet""If You Love Me, Baby"
| 29— || —— || —— || —— || —— || —— || —— || —— || —— || —— || —— 
|
| The Beatles' First
|
|-
! scope="row"| "Sweet Georgia Brown""Take Out Some Insurance on Me, Baby"
| —— || —— || —— || —— || —— || —— || —— || —— || —— || —— || ——
|
| My Bonnie

The Beatles' First
|
|-
! scope="row"| "Ain't She Sweet""Nobody's Child"
| —— || 16— || —— || —— || —— || —— || —— || —— || —— || —— || 19—
|
|The Beatles' First
|
|-
! scope="row"| "A Hard Day's Night""Things We Said Today"
| 1— || 1— || —— || 4— || —— || 2— || 1— || 1— || 1— || —— || —— 
|
| rowspan="4"|A Hard Day's Night
| A Hard Day's Night

Something New
|-
! scope="row"| "A Hard Day's Night""I Should Have Known Better"
| —— || —1 || —— || —— || 1— || —6 || —1 || —1 || —— || —— || 153 
|
 RIAA: Gold
| rowspan="2"|A Hard Day's Night
|-
! scope="row"| "I'll Cry Instead""I'm Happy Just to Dance with You"
| —— || —— || —— || —— || 20— || —— || —— || —— || —— || —— || 2595 
|
|-
! scope="row"| "And I Love Her""If I Fell"
| —— || —1 || —— || 10— || 15— || —25 || —3 || —1 || —— || —— || 1253 
|
| A Hard Day's Night

Something New
|-
! scope="row"| "Matchbox""Slow Down"
| —— || —— || —— || —— || 6— || —— || —— || —— || —— || —— || 1725 
|
| 
| Something New
|-
! scope="row"| "I Feel Fine""She's a Woman"
| 1— || 1— || 3— || 3— || 1— || 3— || 1— || 1— || 11 || —— || 14 
|
 RIAA: Gold
| 
| Beatles '65
|-
! scope="row"| "If I Fell""Tell Me Why" 
| —— || —— || —— || —— || —— || —— || —— || —— || —— || —— || —— 
|
| A Hard Day's Night
| Something New
|-
! scope="row"| "Eight Days a Week""I Don't Want to Spoil the Party"
| rowspan="10"| 1965
| —— || —— || —— || 9— || 1— || 5— || 1— || —— || —— || —— || 139 
|
 RIAA: Gold
|Beatles for Sale
| Beatles VI
|-
! scope="row"| "Ticket to Ride""Yes It Is"
| 1— || 1— || 8— || 10— || 1— || 2— || 1— || 1— || —— || —— || 146 
|
 BPI: Silver
| Help!

| Help!

Beatles VI
|-
! scope="row"| "Rock and Roll Music""I'm a Loser"
| —— || 1— || 4— || 3— || —— || 2— || —— || 1— || —— || —— || ——
|
| rowspan="2"| Beatles for Sale
| rowspan="2"| Beatles '65
|-
! scope="row"| "No Reply""Rock and Roll Music"
| —— || —— || —— || —— || —— || 5— || 62 || —— || —— || —— || —— 
|
|-
! scope="row"| "Help!""I'm Down"
| 1— || 1— || 5— || 5— || 1— || 2— || 1— || 1— || —— || —— || 1—
|
 BPI: Gold
 RIAA: Gold
| Help!

| Help!

|-
! scope="row"| "Yesterday""Act Naturally"
| —— || 2— || 10— || 1— || 4— || 6— || 1— || 1— || 2— || —— || 147 
|
 RIAA: Gold
| Help!
| Yesterday and Today
|-
! scope="row"| "I'll Follow the Sun""I Don't Want to Spoil the Party"
| —— || —— || —— || —— || —— || —— || —— || 10— || —— || —— || —— 
|
| Beatles for Sale
| Beatles '65

Beatles VI
|-
! scope="row"| "Roll Over Beethoven""Misery"
| —— || —— || —— || —— || —— || —— || —— || —— || —— || —— || —— 
|
| With the Beatles

Please Please Me
| The Beatles' Second Album

Introducing... the Beatles
|-
! scope="row"| "Boys""Kansas City/Hey, Hey, Hey, Hey"
| —— || —— || —— || —— || 32— || —18 || —— || —— || —— || —— || —— 
|
| Please Please Me

Beatles For Sale
| The Early Beatles

Beatles VI
|-
! scope="row"| "We Can Work It Out""Day Tripper"
| 1 || 1— || —— || 3— || 1— || 2— || 1 || —1 || 98 || —— || 15
|
 BPI: Silver 
 RIAA: Gold 
| 
| Yesterday and Today
|-
! scope="row"| "Michelle""Girl"
| rowspan="4"| 1966
| —— || —— || 3— || 1— || —— || 6— || 1— || 1— || 1— || —— || —— 
|
| rowspan="2"|Rubber Soul
| Rubber Soul
|-
! scope="row"| "Nowhere Man""What Goes On"
| —— || 1— || 8— || —— || 1— || 3— || —— || —— || —— || —— || 381 
|
 RIAA: Gold
| Yesterday and Today
|-
! scope="row"| "Paperback Writer""Rain"
| 1— || 1— || 4— || 7— || 1— || 1— || 1— || —— || 1— || —— || 123
|
 RIAA: Gold
| 
| Hey Jude
|-
! scope="row"| "Yellow Submarine""Eleanor Rigby"
| 1 || 1— || 1— || 1— || 11 || 1— || 1 || 1— || 11 || —— || 211 
|
 BPI: Gold
 RIAA: Gold
| Revolver
| Revolver
|-
! scope="row"| "Penny Lane""Strawberry Fields Forever"
| rowspan="4"| 1967
| 2 || 1— || 513 || 4— || 11 || 1— || 1 || —1 || 15 || —— || 18 
|
 BPI: Silver
 RIAA: Gold
| 
| rowspan="4"| Magical Mystery Tour
|-
! scope="row"| "All You Need Is Love""Baby, You're a Rich Man"
| 1— || 1— || 1— || 4— || 1— || 1— || 1— || 1— || 1— || —— || 134
|
 BPI: Silver
 RIAA: Gold
| 
|-
! scope="row"| "Hello, Goodbye""I Am the Walrus"
| 1— || 1— || 2— || 2— || 1— || 1— || 1— || 1— || 117 || 2— || 156 
|
 RIAA: Gold
|

|-
! scope="row"| "Magical Mystery Tour (EP)"
| 2 || — || — || — || — || — || — || — || — || — || — 
|
| 
|-
! scope="row"| "Lady Madonna""The Inner Light"
| rowspan="3"| 1968
| 1— || 1— || 1— || 3— || 1— || 2— || 1— || 2— || 1— || 1— || 496 
|
 RIAA: Platinum
| 
| Hey Jude

|-
! scope="row"| "Hey Jude""Revolution"
| 1— || 1— || 1— || 1— || 1— || 1— || 1— || 1— || 11 || 1— || 112 
|
 BPI: Gold
 RIAA: 4× Platinum
| 
| Hey Jude
|-
! scope="row"| "Ob-La-Di, Ob-La-Da""While My Guitar Gently Weeps"
| —— || 1— || 1— || 5— || —— || 1— || 3— || —— || 1— || 1— || —— 
|
| colspan="2"| The Beatles
|-
! scope="row"| "Get Back""Don't Let Me Down"
| rowspan="3"| 1969
| 1— || 1— || 1— || 1— || 1— || 1— || 1— || 1— || 1— || 1— || 135 
|
 BPI: Silver
 RIAA: 2× Platinum
| 
| 

Hey Jude
|-
! scope="row"| "The Ballad of John and Yoko""Old Brown Shoe"
| 1— || 1— || 1— || 1— || —— || 1— || 1— || 1— || 2— || 1— || 8—
|
 RIAA: Gold
| 
|Hey Jude
|-
! scope="row"| "Something""Come Together"
| 4 || 1— || 112 || —2 || 1— || 13 || —2 || 2— || 11 || —2 || 1
|
 BPI: Gold
 RIAA: 2× Platinum
| colspan="2"|Abbey Road
|-
! scope="row"| "Let It Be""You Know My Name (Look Up the Number)"
| rowspan="2"| 1970
| 2— || 1— || 1— || 3— || 1— || 2— || 1— || 1— || 1— || 1— || 1— 
|
 BPI: Platinum
 RIAA: 2× Platinum
| colspan="2" 

|-
! scope="row"| "The Long and Winding Road""For You Blue"
| —— || 7— || —— || 8— || 14 || 26— || 11— || —— || 3— || 8— || 1
|
 BPI: Silver
 RIAA: Platinum
| colspan="2"|Let It Be
|-
! scope="row"| "All Together Now""Hey Bulldog"
| 1972
| —— || —— || —— || —— || —— || —— || 16— || —— || —— || —— || —— 
|
| colspan="2"|Yellow Submarine
|-
! scope="row"| "Yesterday""I Should Have Known Better"
| rowspan="4"| 1976
| 8— || 86— || —— || —— || —— || —— || 26— || —— || —— || —— || —— 
|
| Help!

A Hard Day's Night
| Yesterday and Today

A Hard Day's Night|-
! scope="row"| "Got to Get You into My Life""Helter Skelter"
| —— || 93— || —— || —— || 1— || —— || —— || —— || —— || —— || 7— 
|
 RIAA: Gold
| colspan="2" rowspan="2"| Rock 'n' Roll Music
|-
! scope="row"| "Back in the U.S.S.R.""Twist and Shout"
| 1948 || —— || —— || —— || —— || —— || —— || —— || —— || —— || —— 
|
 BPI: Silver
|-
! scope="row"| "Ob-La-Di, Ob-La-Da""Julia"
| —— || —— || —— || —— || 19— || —— || —— || —— || —— || —— || 49—
|
| colspan="2"|The Beatles
|-
! scope="row"| "Sgt. Pepper's Lonely Hearts Club Band" / "With a Little Help from My Friends""A Day in the Life"
| 1978
| 63— || 78— || —— || —— || —— || —— || —— || —— || —— || —— || 71— 
|
 BPI: Silver
|
| colspan="2"|Sgt. Pepper's Lonely Hearts Club Band
|-
! scope="row"| "The Beatles Movie Medley""I'm Happy Just to Dance with You"
| 1982
| 10— || 33— || —— || 35— || —— || —— || 24— || —— || —— || —— || 12—  
|
| 

A Hard Day's Night
| 

A Hard Day's Night
|-
! scope="row"| "Baby It's You"
| rowspan="2"| 1995
| 7 || 33 || — || 43 || 67 || 94 || 44 || — || — || — || 67
|
| colspan= "2"|Live at the BBC
|-
! scope="row"| "Free as a Bird""Christmas Time (Is Here Again)"
| 2— || 6— || 32— || 11— || 6— || 37— || 9— || —— || —— || 25— || 6— 
|
 BPI: Silver
 RIAA: Gold
| colspan="2"|Anthology 1

|-
! scope="row"| "Real Love""Baby's in Black"
| 1996
| 4— || 6— || —— || 50— || 12— || 45— || 21— || —— || —— || 26— || 11— 
|
 RIAA: Gold
| colspan="2"|Anthology 2

|-
| colspan="18" style="font-size:90%" | "—" denotes that the recording did not chart or was not released in that territory.
|}

Billboard Year-End performancesNotesFlexi discs
The Beatles released seven consecutive Christmas records on flexi disc for members of their UK and US fan clubs, from 1963 to 1969, ranging in length between 3:58 and 7:48. These short collections had a mix of spoken and musical messages for their official fan clubs.

Other appearances
The Beatles notably very rarely appear on compilation albums with other artists.

Videography

Films

Documentaries

Home videosNotesTV series

Notes

Music videosNotes'''

See also
 Apple Records discography, the albums and singles of the Beatles' record label, many of which had involvement by members of the Beatles
 The Beatles bootleg recordings
 The Beatles' recording sessions
 List of songs recorded by the Beatles
 The Beatles Tapes from the David Wigg Interviews'', a collection of interviews with the band

References

Sources

External links
 Discography on the Beatles' official website 
 Beatles LPs, EPs and singles all over the world
 A UK discography, including details on bootleg releases
 The Beatles in Canada, includes Canada-only discography
 The Beatles on Vee-Jay Records
 The Beatles album discography timeline on Histropedia
 The Beatles discography on the Beatles Bible
 

Discography
Beatles, The
Beatles, The
Beatles, The